Phanoptis miltorrhabda is a moth of the family Notodontidae. It is found in Peru and Bolivia.

Adults have red markings and are possibly mimics of the butterfly Abananote erinome.

References

Notes

External links
 
 
 

Moths described in 1922
Notodontidae of South America